Charles Lee Duffy (born May 10, 1976) is an American serial killer and rapist who murdered three women in the Atlanta metropolitan area over six weeks in the summer of 1997. Having been turned in by his mother, Duffy later pleaded guilty and received two life sentences for his crimes.

Early life 
Duffy was born on May 10, 1976, in Norcross, Georgia.

Murders  
On June 24, 1997 40-year-old Priscilla Culberson was reported missing after she failed to show up for work. The subsequent investigation led to police locating her purse and other bloody items along the side of the road in Atlanta, but her body was not found until the following sundown when Culberson's 20-year-old daughter discovered her nude body in an empty lot near a bus terminal. Detectives located semen samples from the killer, as well as blood which were determined to have been the result of Culberson attempting to fight off her attacker. Both samples were taken as evidence.  

Just after 5:00pm on July 30, 42-year-old Gwendolyn Wyche, the daughter of a Minister O.L. Blackshear, was shot in the back multiple times just outside her home. Police later located her laying on the sidewalk, and rushed her to Dekalb Medical Center, but could not resuscitate her and she was pronounced dead not long after. The initial motive for the killing was thought to have been a failed robbery. The suspect was also reported to have been driving a blue vehicle, and the weapon used was confirmed to be a revolver.

Two days later, on August 1, 52-year-old Pok Yeo Kim was working in the afternoon when a robbery occurred, during which the assailant shot her, and stole money from the register. A surveillance camera captured the individual on film, and he was described as a black man, 5ft 10inch, approximately 160 pounds and about 23 in age.

Investigation and arrest 
The last two murders were eventually connected by police, who sought out for a suspect. They released the surveillance video to the public in hopes of new information. Soon after, a woman contacted the heads on the investigative team, and claimed her son, 21-year-old Charles Lee Duffy was the perpetrator, after identifying him as the man seen on the video. Duffy, a convicted robber, was on probation at the time of the killings, after being released from prison in January after spending time for robbery and auto-theft. After this, detectives focused their investigation on their prime suspect, who was confirmed to be involved in the death of Yeo Kim after a partial fingerprint match. Afterwards the investigative team went public with their information, but Duffy would not surrender to the police, despite urges from his mother. 

Days later, police picked up a man walking alone apparently appearing high on drugs. When asked who he was, the man claimed he was Tarus Smith, and he was found to be in possession of a screw driver, so he was arrested and sent to the Chamblee City jail to await further charges. It was not until a while later, that Smith was confirmed to be Duffy, which came off as a relief to investigators who believed Duffy was a danger to society.

Imprisonment 
Duffy made a full confession to the killings of Yeo Kim and Wyche, thus he skipped a trial, and he was sentenced to life imprisonment without incident.  

In 2003, Fulton County District Attorney Paul Howard formed the Fulton County Cold Case unit, which re-examined unsolved cases in the counties history.  As a result, many unsolved cases in the area that included DNA were reinvestigated, and in some instances were solved. In 2005, the murder of Priscilla Culberson, which was still unsolved by that time, was reexamined. As a result the semen found on her body was ran in the crime lab, and after a DNA profiling test, it matched Duffy's DNA, which was on record after he was admitted to Georgia State Prison. After confronted with the news, Duffy confessed, and in 2007 was given a life sentence without the possibility for parole.

See also 
 List of serial killers in the United States

External Links 
 Offender Query

References 

1976 births
Living people
African-American people
American male criminals
American people convicted of murder
American prisoners sentenced to life imprisonment
People convicted of murder by Georgia (U.S. state)
Prisoners sentenced to life imprisonment by Georgia (U.S. state)
Violence against women in the United States
Male serial killers
20th-century American criminals
1997 murders in the United States
Criminals from Georgia (U.S. state)